Jefferson Township is a township in Daviess County, in the U.S. state of Missouri.

Jefferson Township was established in 1840, and named after President Thomas Jefferson.

References

Townships in Missouri
Townships in Daviess County, Missouri